Antonis Georgiadis (25 January 1933 – 16 November 2020) was a Greek football player and manager.

Career
Georgiadis managed Elpis Drama, Iraklis Serres, Panserraikos, Kavala FC, Doxa Drama, Olympiakos Volos, PAS Giannina, Panachaiki, OFI Crete, Larissa, Aris, AEK Athens, Olympiacos, Apollon Kalamarias, Ethnikos Piraeus Greece, and Paniliakos.

Managerial statistics

List does not include summer competitions sponsored by the Greek FA in the 1960's and 1970's.

References

1933 births
2020 deaths
Greek footballers
Footballers from Drama, Greece
Association football midfielders
Greek football managers
Greece national football team managers
PAS Giannina F.C. managers
Panachaiki F.C. managers
Paniliakos F.C. managers
OFI Crete F.C. managers
Athlitiki Enosi Larissa F.C. managers
Aris Thessaloniki F.C. managers
AEK Athens F.C. managers
Olympiacos F.C. managers
Ethnikos Piraeus F.C. managers
Apollon Pontou FC managers
Olympiacos Volos F.C. managers